State Highway 22 (SH 22) is a State Highway in Kerala, India that starts in Kodungallur and ends at State Highway 23. The highway is 70.5 km long.

The Route Map 
SH 22 Highway Shornur <- Cheruthuruthy <- Vazhacode Junction <- Wadakkanchery <- Mulangunnathukavu <- Viyyoor <- North bus stand <- Trichur Round West <- Kuruppam Road <- Kokkalai <- Koorkanchery <- Palakkal <- Chevoor <- Perumbillissery <- Thiruvillakkavu <- Urakam <- Karuvannur - Mapranam <- Irinjalakuda <- Vellangallur <- Pullut <- Kodungallur

Districts connected by State Highway 
Thrissur
Palakkad

Townships on the State Highway 
Irinjalakuda

See also 
 Roads in Kerala
 List of State Highways in Kerala

References 

State Highways in Kerala
Roads in Thrissur district
Roads in Palakkad district